KHHG may refer to:

 Huntington Municipal Airport (Indiana) (ICAO code KHHG)
 KCBN, a radio station (107.7 FM) licensed to Hamilton, Texas, United States, which held the call sign KHHG from 2010 to 2012